Cartouche was a Belgian Eurodance group whose biggest dance hit from 1991 was "Feel the Groove", which peaked at number 13 in 1991 on the French Singles Chart. The members consisted of Myrelle Tholen and Jean-Paul Visser. The group only released one album, House Music All Night Long in 1991. The group also sang "Miracles", "Shame" and "Touch the Sky" (in 1994) which were all composed and produced by Serge Ramaekers.

Discography

Studio albums

Singles

References

Belgian electronic music groups
Belgian dance music groups
Belgian Eurodance groups
Scotti Brothers Records artists